Thomas Hakluyt (fl. 1559) was an English politician.

He was a Member (MP) of the Parliament of England for Leominster in 1559.

References

Year of birth missing
Year of death missing
English MPs 1559